Petros, the original Greek and Coptic version of the name Peter, meaning "stone" or "rock", may refer to:

People
 Petros (given name)
 Petros (surname)
 Petros (footballer), Brazilian footballer Petros Matheus dos Santos Araújo (born 1989)

Places
 Petros (Chornohora), a mountain in Ukraine
 Petros, Oklahoma, United States, an unincorporated community
 Petros, Tennessee, United States, an unincorporated community and census-designated place

Other uses
 Petros (pelican), mascot of the Greek island of Mykonos
 Petros Guitars, guitar ensemble
 Petroleum Sarawak Berhad or PETROS, state-owned company in Sarawak, Malaysia
 Petro's Chili & Chips, a restaurant franchise based in Knoxville, Tennessee